Dali County is a county under the administration of the prefecture-level city of Weinan, in the east-central part of Shaanxi province, China, bordering Shanxi province to the east. The population in 2002 was 690 thousand. Its economy focuses on agriculture, mainly yielding cotton and fruits, such as watermelon. Dali was a county dated back to Qin Dynasty. It used to be named as Linjin, Dali, Wuxiang, Fengyi, Tongzhou, etc.

Administration
Dali County governs 18 towns.

Towns

-Towns are upgraded from Townships.

-Former Townships are merged to others.

Hujia, Buchang, Boshi, Shicao, Bayu, Xizhai, Zhangjia, Shadi

Climate

Transportation
Dali railway station of the Datong–Xi'an passenger railway, with frequent service to Xi'an and Taiyuan.

Famous Figures
 Dali (fossil), excavated in 1978
 Ruoxi Zhang, former Minister of Education Ministry of PRC, is from Zhaoyi town in Dali county.
 Fengshou Shi, an expert of rapid calculation, is also from this county.
 Huaiying Dang was man of letters in Jin Dynasty. His ancestral home is Dali county.
 Xiandeng Ma was an official and a successful candidate in the highest imperial examinations in late Qing Dynasty.

References

County-level divisions of Shaanxi
Weinan